Fiorenza Bassoli (9 August 1948 – 5 July 2020) was an Italian politician.

Bassoli was born in Reggiolo on 9 August 1948. She began her political career affiliated with the Italian Communist Party, and later joined its successors the Democratic Party of the Left, Democrats of the Left and the Democratic Party. She was a member of the council of Sesto San Giovanni, then served as the first woman mayor of the comune between 1985 and 1994, succeeding Libero Biagi. Bassoli was subsequently elected to the Regional Council of Lombardy, in office from 1995 to 2005. She then served in the Senate from 2006 to 2013.

Bassoli died in Milan on 5 July 2020, aged 71.

References

1948 births
2020 deaths
Politicians of Emilia-Romagna
Italian Communist Party politicians
Women mayors of places in Italy
Senators of Legislature XV of Italy
Senators of Legislature XVI of Italy
Democrats of the Left politicians
21st-century Italian women politicians
20th-century Italian women politicians
Mayors of places in Lombardy
Members of the Italian Senate from Lombardy
Members of the Regional Council of Lombardy
People from the Province of Reggio Emilia
Italian city councillors
Democratic Party of the Left politicians
Women members of the Senate of the Republic (Italy)